Jerome Cunningham (born May 25, 1991) is a former American football tight end. He played college football at Southern Connecticut State.

Professional career
After going undrafted in the 2013 NFL Draft, Cunningham was invited to the Indianapolis Colts' minicamp, but he did not receive a contract offer and spent the 2013 season out of football.

New York Giants
On August 5, 2014, Cunningham was signed by the New York Giants. On August 26, 2014, he was waived. On September 3, 2014, Cunningham was added to the Giants' practice squad. Cunningham spent the first 15 weeks of the 2014 regular season on the practice squad. On December 17, 2014, Cunningham was promoted to the active roster for the last two games of the regular season.

Cunningham made the Giants' 53-man roster to begin the 2015 regular season. On October 18, 2015, he was waived by the Giants. He was re-signed to the Giants' practice squad on October 21, 2015. Cunningham was promoted to the active roster on November 5, 2015. On May 5, 2016, the Giants waived Cunningham.

New York Jets
Cunningham was claimed off waivers by the New York Jets on May 9, 2016. On May 24, 2016, he was waived.

Tennessee Titans
On May 25, 2016, Cunningham was claimed off waivers by the Tennessee Titans. On September 2, 2016, he was released by the Titans as part of final roster cuts and was signed to the practice squad the next day. He signed a reserve/future contract with the Titans on January 2, 2017.

On September 2, 2017, Cunningham was waived by the Titans and was signed to the practice squad the next day. He was released on September 12, 2017. He was re-signed to the practice squad on December 13, 2017. On December 19, 2017, he was released from the practice squad.

On August 7, 2018, Cunningham was re-signed by the Titans. He was waived on September 1, 2018 and was signed to the practice squad the next day. He was released on September 18, 2018.

Detroit Lions
On September 26, 2018, Cunningham was signed to the Detroit Lions' practice squad. On October 24, he was released and re-signed to the practice squad three days later. On October 31, he was cut again but re-signed the next day. He was promoted to the active roster on December 11, 2018.

On August 31, 2019, Cunningham was waived by the Lions.

Washington Redskins
On September 25, 2019, Cunningham was signed by the Washington Redskins. He was placed on injured reserve on October 15.

After the season, the Redskins chose not to assign a restricted free agent tender to Cunningham, and he became a free agent on March 18, 2020.

References

1991 births
Living people
Sportspeople from Waterbury, Connecticut
Players of American football from Connecticut
American football tight ends
Southern Connecticut State Owls football players
New York Giants players
New York Jets players
Tennessee Titans players
Detroit Lions players
Washington Redskins players